The 2016 Royal Rumble was the 29th annual Royal Rumble professional wrestling pay-per-view and livestreaming event produced by WWE. It took place on January 24, 2016, at the Amway Center in Orlando, Florida. The event was also the fifth Royal Rumble pay-per-view to be held in the state of Florida, after the 1990, 1991, 1995, and 2006 events, the second to be held in Orlando (after 1990), and WWE's first pay-per-view event to be held at the Amway Center.

Traditionally since 1993, the Royal Rumble match winner receives a world championship match at that year's WrestleMania. For the 2016 event, however, Roman Reigns was scheduled to defend the WWE World Heavyweight Championship in the 2016 Royal Rumble match and as the number one entrant. This was the main event match, which was won by the returning Triple H, who eliminated Reigns before lastly eliminating Dean Ambrose to win the championship. This was Triple H's second Rumble win and he became the third person to win the match as the number 30 entrant. This was only the second time that a Rumble winner won the world championship for winning the Rumble match, after the 1992 event, where the vacant title was the prize, but it was the first in which the reigning champion defended the title in the match.

Five other matches were contested at the event, including one on the Kickoff pre-show. The event was notable for the WWE pay-per-view debut of longtime Total Nonstop Action Wrestling (now Impact Wrestling) mainstay AJ Styles as the third entrant in the Royal Rumble match. This was also the last Royal Rumble event to be held before the reintroduction of the brand extension in July.

Production

Background 
The Royal Rumble is an annual gimmick pay-per-view (PPV) and WWE Network event, produced every January by WWE since 1988. It is one of the promotion's original four pay-per-views, along with WrestleMania, SummerSlam, and Survivor Series, dubbed the "Big Four". It is named after the Royal Rumble match, a modified battle royal in which the participants enter at timed intervals instead of all beginning in the ring at the same time. The 2016 event was the 29th event in the Royal Rumble chronology and was scheduled to be held on January 24, 2016, at the Amway Center in Orlando, Florida.

The Royal Rumble match generally features 30 wrestlers and the winner traditionally earns a world championship match at that year's WrestleMania. For 2016, that would have been a match for the WWE World Heavyweight Championship at WrestleMania 32; however, reigning WWE World Heavyweight Champion Roman Reigns was scheduled to defend the title in the match as the number one entrant. This marked the second time that the promotion's world championship was the prize of the match (the first being in 1992), but the first time in which the champion defended the title in the match, as in 1992, the championship had been vacated, and it was decided that the Rumble winner would win the vacant title.

Storylines
The card consisted of six matches, including one of the kickoff pre-show matches. They resulted from scripted storylines, where wrestlers portrayed heroes, villains, or less distinguishable characters in scripted events that built tension and culminated in a  match or a series of matches, with results predetermined by their writers, with storylines produced on their weekly television shows, Raw and SmackDown.

Traditionally, the winner of the 30-man Royal Rumble match is awarded a world championship match at WrestleMania. However, as a culmination of his attempts to deprive the WWE World Heavyweight Champion Roman Reigns for attacking his son-in-law Triple H and overall disrespecting the McMahon family, WWE CEO and Chairman Vince McMahon decided that Reigns would have to defend his title in the Rumble match as entrant number one.

On the December 28 episode of Raw, Big Show was the first wrestler to announce his participation in the Royal Rumble match. Early in January, Curtis Axel, Ryback, The Wyatt Family (Bray Wyatt, Luke Harper, Erick Rowan, and Braun Strowman), Dolph Ziggler, Chris Jericho, Stardust, and Sheamus were added to the match. On the January 11 episode of Raw, Stephanie McMahon announced that Brock Lesnar would compete in the match in spite of Lesnar's advocate Paul Heyman arguing that Lesnar should bypass the match and face the winner at WrestleMania 32. The next week on Raw, a rigged lottery assigned the #1 spot to Reigns, meaning that he would be the first contestant to enter the match.

At TLC: Tables, Ladders & Chairs, Dean Ambrose defeated Kevin Owens to win the WWE Intercontinental Championship. Their rivalry intensified for over weeks; including a match ending in a double countout for the Intercontinental Championship. On the January 14 episode of SmackDown, Owen's accepted Ambrose's challenge to a Last Man Standing match for the Intercontinental Championship at the Royal Rumble.

On the January 7, 2016 episode of SmackDown, John Cena introduced Kalisto as an opponent for United States Champion Alberto Del Rio. After Kalisto won the match, he was granted a title match on the January 11 episode of Raw, in which he defeated Del Rio to win the United States Championship. Del Rio went on to win back the championship the following night on SmackDown. Subsequently, another title match between the two was scheduled for the Royal Rumble.

On the January 4 episode of Raw, Becky Lynch was attacked by Divas Champion Charlotte after defeating her in a non-title match. With the help of father Ric Flair, Charlotte defeated Lynch to retain the championship on the January 7 episode of SmackDown. Subsequently, Lynch challenged Charlotte for another title match at the Royal Rumble. Though Charlotte was unwilling to grant Lynch another title opportunity, Lynch goaded Flair to accept the challenge on his daughter's behalf.

On the January 11 episode of Raw, The Usos defeated The New Day. The following week on Raw, a tag team title defense by The New Day against The Usos was scheduled for the Royal Rumble.

On January 20, a fatal four-way tag team match between Darren Young and Damien Sandow, The Dudley Boyz, The Ascension, and Mark Henry and Jack Swagger was scheduled for the Royal Rumble pre-show, with both members of the winning team earning a spot in the Royal Rumble match later in the night.

Event

Pre-show 
On the Royal Rumble kickoff pre-show, The Dudley Boyz (Bubba Ray Dudley and D-Von Dudley), Jack Swagger and Mark Henry, Damien Sandow and Darren Young, and The Ascension (Konnor and Viktor) competed in a Fatal 4-Way Tag Team match, in which the winners would qualify for the Royal Rumble match. In the end, Bubba Ray and D-Von performed a 3-D on Viktor before Swagger applied a Patriot Lock on Bubba Ray whilst Henry performed a Running Splash on Bubba Ray. Henry pinned Viktor, allowing Swagger and Henry to qualify for the Royal Rumble match.

Preliminary matches 
The actual pay-per-view opened with Dean Ambrose defending the Intercontinental Championship against Kevin Owens in a Last Man Standing match. During the match, Owens performed a Cannonball through the barricade on Ambrose. Owens attempted a Powerbomb on Ambrose through two chairs but Ambrose countered with a Back Body Drop through the chairs. Ambrose performed Dirty Deeds on Owens on a chair. Ambrose performed a Diving Elbow Drop on Owens through a table. Owens performed a Swinging Fisherman Suplex off the top rope on Ambrose through a table. In the end, Ambrose pushed Owens off the top rope through two tables stacked outside the ring. As Owens could not stand by a ten count, Ambrose won the match to retain the title.

Next, The New Day (Big E and Kofi Kingston) defended the WWE Tag Team Championship against The Usos (Jimmy Uso and Jey Uso). In the closing moments of the match, Big E tackled Jimmy into the barricade, only for Jey to perform a Superkick on Big E. Jey leapt to the top rope but was caught by Big E, who performed a Big Ending on Jey to retain the title.

After that, Alberto Del Rio defended the United States Championship against Kalisto. During the match Del Rio attempted a double foot stomp on Kalisto whilst he was held in the tree of woe, but Kalisto avoided it and executed a Salida Del Sol, however, Del Rio grabbed the ropes to void the pinfall. In the end, as Del Rio removed the padding from a turnbuckle, Kalisto performed a Diving Hurricanrana on Del Rio, knocking Del Rio into the exposed turnbuckle. Kalisto performed a second Salida Del Sol on Del Rio to win the title.

In the fourth match, Charlotte defended her Divas Championship against Becky Lynch. In the climax of the match, as Lynch applied the Dis-arm-her on Charlotte, Ric Flair threw his jacket onto Lynch. Lynch threw the jacket only for Charlotte to execute a Spear on Lynch to retain the championship. After the match, Sasha Banks returned and applied the Bank Statement on Charlotte. Flair pulled Charlotte out of the ring.

Main event 
The main event was the 30-man Royal Rumble match for the WWE World Heavyweight Championship. WWE World Heavyweight Champion Roman Reigns and Rusev began the match as the number one and number two entrants, respectively. After Reigns eliminated Rusev, AJ Styles entered at number three, marking Styles's WWE pay-per-view debut, and eliminated the next entrants, Tyler Breeze and Curtis Axel, the latter of who was attacked by Erick Rowan a year earlier. On orders of WWE chairman Vince McMahon, the League of Nations pulled Reigns out of the ring and attacked him, where Rusev performed a Running Splash on Reigns through a broadcast table, causing an injured Reigns to be taken backstage.

As the match continued, Braun Strowman eliminated Kane and Big Show. Kevin Owens eliminated AJ Styles but was later eliminated by Sami Zayn, who was a surprise entrant at number twenty. Brock Lesnar eliminated Jack Swagger and three members of the Wyatt Family: Erick Rowan, Luke Harper, and Braun Strowman. When Bray Wyatt entered, The Wyatt Family attacked Lesnar again and eliminated him from the match. Whilst Sheamus entered, Reigns attacked him with a Superman Punch before returning to the match. Reigns then eliminated The Miz and Alberto Del Rio.

At number thirty, Triple H, who had been inactive since being attacked by Roman Reigns at TLC, made his return and eliminated Dolph Ziggler. Sheamus performed a Brogue Kick on Wyatt and, together with Triple H, eliminated Wyatt. Chris Jericho was eliminated by Dean Ambrose. Sheamus attempted another Brogue Kick on Ambrose; however, Ambrose countered and Sheamus fell onto the ring apron. Reigns eliminated Sheamus after a Superman Punch only for Triple H to eliminate him. After a back-and-forth shuffle, Triple H eliminated Ambrose, resulting in Triple H winning his second Royal Rumble and becoming WWE World Heavyweight Champion for the ninth time, and a 14-time World Champion overall.

Reception 
The event received generally positive reviews, with most commentators praising the undercard (particularly the Last Man Standing match between Dean Ambrose and Kevin Owens) and noting a marked improvement in the titular match from the 2014 and 2015 events.

Some of the reviewers were more critical of the event, such as John Powell of Slam! Wrestling rating the match a 6-out-of-10 match, expressing his disappointment in the outcome of the main event match which he felt represented WWE "going out of their way to frustrate fans and keep their product in a continued state of uninspired monotony". Powell claimed that it "had its moments here and there" but also noting inconsistencies with the past 28 matches, such as allowing Roman Reigns to rejoin after "missing the majority of the match". The Intercontinental title match was the best rated on the show at 8.5 out of 10, and was described as a "very brutal affair with Owens and Ambrose hammering each other into oblivion with chairs, kendo sticks and tables". The tag title match was called "standard, hum-drum" and rated 5 out of 10; the United States title match was "a classic David vs. Goliath encounter", rated 6 out of 10, and the women's title match was described as "unexceptional" with a poor ending, rated 3 out of 10. The pre-show match was also rated 3 out of 10, described as a "snorefest" and a "mess". Lastly, Powell described AJ Styles' re-debut as "one of the highlights of the night", and noted the positive crowd responses to Becky Lynch and Damien Sandow.

Dave Scherer of PWInsider wrote that the opening match for the Intercontinental Championship was "an awesome spectacle, with really good psychology mixed in" as "it felt like they hated each other". Scherer added that the tag title match was "a lot of fun", and the United States title match "good, if you can appreciate Lucha", otherwise "a lot of Kalisto's offense isn't believable". Scherer expressed mild disappointment towards the Divas Championship match, writing that it was not an "NXT style match", and described Ric Flair forcibly kissing Becky Lynch as "sexual assault". For the Royal Rumble match, Scherer, according to him, noted that the booking of the match turned the crowd against Roman Reigns, writing that "Vince thought he booked [the Rumble] for the people to cheer for Reigns", but that "the Orlando crowd made Triple H the "face". Scherer added that he was not surprised at Triple H's entry and win of the main event.

James Montgomery of Rolling Stone wrote that "the Royal Rumble was an entertaining show, paced by the battle royal and bolstered by its undercard". He described the opening match as "a thoroughly entertaining I.C. battle" and the tag-team title match as "a creative match that had its moments, but hopefully signaled the end of this feud". He described the United States Championship bout as "a hard-hitting match that featured a great false finish", and expressed his desire for Kalisto to have "an extended run" with it. For the Royal Rumble match, Montgomery wrote that it was a "pretty good Rumble. Storylines began and advanced." He described the arrival of AJ Styles as "surreal" and praised Dean Ambrose's performance, writing that "his future appears to be brightening by the minute". However, he expressed disappointment at the use of Brock Lesnar in the match and added that "Triple H's victory at the Royal Rumble will no doubt cool some folks' reactions to the event as a whole".

James Caldwell of PWTorch praised the Intercontinental Championship match, writing: "What a match. Just a nonstop battle capturing the story of this feud" and rating it as 4 and a quarter stars out of five. Caldwell rated the tag-team title match at 2 and a quarter stars out of five, describing it as "an up-and-down match with the main issue of no reason to view New Day as heels". He gave the United States Championship match 2 and three-quarters out of 5, calling it as a "solid, unspectacular singles match", and wrote that the Divas Championship match "was more of a bridge to what was next" in reference to the appearance of Sasha Banks. Caldwell gave the Rumble main event 3 and three-quarters out of 5, commenting that there were "overall, too many downpoints for this year's Rumble hurting some up-points". He wrote that "the Rumble started really well, got ridiculous in the middle with the now-annual compromise of the Rumble, and ended with the crowd not sure what to do with the players in the mix outside of Ambrose".

Will Pruett of Pro Wrestling Dot Net described the event as "a delightful show from beginning to end". The Rumble match was described as "very fun" and the best since 2010. Pruett raised questions over the booking of Roman Reigns, noting that he "failed to truly be heroic" twice at the event. In comparison, Pruett felt that Triple H came across being the "conquering hero" and "avenging party" in the storyline against Reigns. Regarding Dean Ambrose, Pruett felt he "was presented as more of a star on this show than he has been in a long time", commenting that "unlike Roman Reigns, who walked away, Ambrose fought hard and still kept fighting to the end". He described the opening match between Ambrose and Owens as "insane". Pruett wrote that the re-debuting AJ Styles "instantly seemed like he fit on the roster", but noted that he was "not presented in the upper echelon of WWE". For other matches, Pruett called Kalisto's win "a major surprise"; while lamenting that "the lines of the WWE women's division were blurred once again" as to who fans should support between Sasha Banks and Charlotte after their post-match antics.

Kyle Johnson of the Wrestling Observer specifically analyzed the merits of the Royal Rumble match. While not "one of the greatest", it achieved two "key things that any good Rumble should": firstly helping to "advance or create undercard storylines heading into Wrestlemania", secondly helping to "generate a handful of legitimate title contenders for the year to follow": Braun Strowman, Bray Wyatt, Kevin Owens and AJ Styles. For the negatives, Johnson highlighted storyline irregularities: Triple H winning cleanly without any "underhanded advantage"; Reigns "voluntarily" leaving a title match, returning later "not selling any injuries whatsoever", the League of Nations not eliminating Reigns; and no Lesnar rampage post-elimination.

Appraisals 
Hall of Famer Bret Hart gave a strongly negative appraisal of the show, ranking the match as "one of the least exciting" in history, and the overall event as perhaps "the worst Royal Rumble". He said of Triple H's WWE World Heavyweight Championship win in the Rumble match "I didn't like the decision that Triple H, surprise, put the belt on himself again... it just showed a real lack of imagination if you ask me".

Aftermath 
On the episode of Raw of the following night, The Authority decided that Triple H would defend the WWE World Heavyweight Championship at WrestleMania 32 against the winner of a Triple Threat Match between Roman Reigns, Dean Ambrose, and Brock Lesnar, to be held at Fastlane. Roman Reigns won the match (and the title opportunity at WrestleMania) by pinning Dean Ambrose. However, Ambrose also received a title match in the run-up to WrestleMania, at WWE Roadblock, where Triple H defeated him to retain the championship. Prior to his Triple Threat match with Roman Reigns and Brock Lesnar at Fastlane, Dean Ambrose lost the Intercontinental Championship on the February 15 episode of Raw in a "Fatal 5-Way" Match also involving Kevin Owens, Dolph Ziggler, Stardust, and Tyler Breeze when Owens pinned Breeze to retain the title.

The Usos had another confrontation with the New Day, after the latter team interrupted the Usos' cousin, The Rock, who appeared on the January 25 episode of Raw. The Usos forced the trio into the ring, where The Rock attacked each member with his signature moves. On the February 8 episode of Raw, The Usos and The Dudley Boyz defeated The New Day and Mark Henry in an 8-Man Tag Team Match. After the match, The Dudley Boyz attacked The Usos, turning heels in the process.

Also, on the January 25 episode of Raw, AJ Styles made his debut on Raw, defeating Chris Jericho. The two shook hands after the match but Jericho refused to release Styles' hand while giving him a staredown before leaving. After Styles defeated The Miz on the February 4 episode of SmackDown, Jericho challenged Styles to a rematch. Jericho defeated Styles on the episode of SmackDown of the following week, giving Styles his first loss since the Rumble.

Sasha Banks and Becky Lynch additionally faced each other on the January 25 episode of Raw in a match which ended in disqualification after Charlotte attacked them. After Banks confirmed her intentions of going after the Divas Championship and split from Team B.A.D. on the February 1 Raw, she faced Lynch that night in a rematch which ended with Banks winning by disqualification after Team B.A.D members Naomi and Tamina attacked her, turning her face in the process. Lynch helped Banks fend off Naomi and Tamina leading to a temporary and uneasy alliance between the two. Also, on the same night Charlotte lost a non-title match to Brie Bella by roll-up. This led to a title match between the two for the Divas Championship scheduled for Fastlane, in which Charlotte won it.

The 2016 Royal Rumble was the last Royal Rumble event to occur before the reintroduction of the brand extension in July, which again split the roster between the Raw and SmackDown brands, where wrestlers were exclusively assigned to perform. As such, another world championship was introduced. After the WWE World Heavyweight Championship became exclusive to SmackDown and renamed to WWE Championship, the WWE Universal Championship was introduced for Raw.

Results

Royal Rumble entrances and eliminations

 – NXT

 – Winner

(*) – Braun Strowman, Luke Harper, and Erick Rowan returned to the ring to eliminate Brock Lesnar, after they were eliminated by him.
(**) – The Miz stayed around ringside before officially entering the ring.
(***) – Sheamus was attacked by Roman Reigns before officially entering the ring.
(****) – The League of Nations attacked Roman Reigns, taking him out of the match for approximately 30 minutes. Reigns was not eliminated, but then returned to the ring.

References

External links 
 

2016
2016 WWE Network events
2016 in professional wrestling in Florida
Professional wrestling shows in Orlando, Florida
2016 WWE pay-per-view events
January 2016 events in the United States